Raid on Iran is a 1980 board game published by Steve Jackson Games.

Gameplay
Raid on Iran is a simulation of what might have occurred if the mission to rescue American hostages in Iran had reached Tehran.

Publication history
Steve Jackson Games published three wargames in October 1980, designed as minigames - Raid on Iran, Kung Fu 2100, and One-Page Bulge, and of these Raid on Iran was the best seller due to the Iran Hostage Crisis being recent at the time.

Reception
Bob Von Gruenigen reviewed Raid on Iran in The Space Gamer No. 36. Von Gruenigen commented that "Raid on Iran is an enjoyable game, despite some minor faults. [...] I recommend it anyway."

References

Board games introduced in 1980
Steve Jackson Games games

External links